Deleon Richards (born September 18, 1976) is an American gospel singer. In the 28th annual Grammy awards, she was nominated for Best Soul Gospel Performance - Female.

Discography
 DeLeon (Myrrh, 1984)
 Don't Follow The Crowd (Rejoice, 1987)
 We Need To Hear From You (Word, 1989)
 New Direction (Word, 1992)
 My Life (Intersound, 1996)
 Straight From The Heart (Tommy Boy Gospel, 2001)
 Here In Me (DeMari/Arrow, 2008)

References

External links
 

Living people
American gospel singers
1976 births